The name Flossie has been used for one tropical cyclone in the Atlantic Ocean, seven tropical cyclones in the Eastern Pacific Ocean, and nine tropical cyclones in the western Pacific.

It was used in the Atlantic before the formal naming system was instituted:
 Hurricane Flossie (1978)

And another was used in the Atlantic, but was spelled differently:
 Hurricane Flossy (1956)

Flossie is on the modern six-year lists in the Eastern Pacific:
 Tropical Storm Flossie (1983)
 Tropical Storm Flossie (1989)
 Hurricane Flossie (1995)
 Hurricane Flossie (2001)
 Hurricane Flossie (2007) – passed near Hawaii.
 Tropical Storm Flossie (2013) – almost made landfall in Hawaii, but moved to the north and weakened.
 Hurricane Flossie (2019) – neared Hawaii as a tropical depression.

Flossie was used for nine tropical cyclones in the Western Pacific:
 Tropical Storm Flossie (1950) (T5007)
 Typhoon Flossie (1954) (T5404)
 Typhoon Flossie (1958) (T5817) – affected Japan.
 Tropical Storm Flossie (1961) (T6109, 28W)
 Typhoon Flossie (1964) (T6409, 12W) – struck China.
 Typhoon Flossie (1966) (T6622, 24W)
 Tropical Storm Flossie (1969) (T6912, 15W) – approached Taiwan.
 Typhoon Flossie (1972) (T7218, 18W, Nitang)
 Typhoon Flossie (1975) (T7516, 19W) – struck southern China.

Atlantic hurricane set index articles
Pacific hurricane set index articles
Pacific typhoon set index articles